Fajar Handika (born February 4, 1990) is an Indonesian professional footballer who plays as a defensive midfielder for Liga 2 club Persipal Palu.

Club career

Kalteng Putra
He was signed for Kalteng Putra to play in Liga 1 in the 2019 season. Handika made his league debut on 16 May 2019 in a match against PSIS Semarang at the Moch. Soebroto Stadium, Magelang.

Badak Lampung
He was signed for Badak Lampung to play in the Liga 2 in the 2020 season. This season was suspended on 27 March 2020 due to the COVID-19 pandemic. The season was abandoned and was declared void on 20 January 2021.

RANS Cilegon
In 2021, Fajar Handika signed a contract with Indonesian Liga 2 club RANS Cilegon.

PSM Makassar
He was signed for PSM Makasar to play in Liga 1 in the 2021 season. Handika made his debut on 18 September 2021 in a match against Persebaya Surabaya at the Si Jalak Harupat Stadium, Soreang.

References

External links

1989 births
Living people
Indonesian footballers
Liga 1 (Indonesia) players
Liga 2 (Indonesia) players
PSDS Deli Serdang players
PSPS Pekanbaru players
Persela Lamongan players
Pro Duta FC players
Gresik United players
Mitra Kukar players
Madura United F.C. players
PS Barito Putera players
Kalteng Putra F.C. players
Badak Lampung F.C. players
RANS Nusantara F.C. players
PSM Makassar players
Persipal Palu players
Indonesian Premier Division players
People from Deli Serdang Regency
Sportspeople from North Sumatra
Association football midfielders